Alanzu is a small town in Okpho Township, Tharrawaddy District, in the Bago Region of southern-central Burma. It is located to the due east of Okpho.
National Highway 2 passes to the west of the town.

References

External links
Maplandia World Gazetteer

Populated places in Tharrawaddy District
Township capitals of Myanmar
Okpho Township